Jared Keith Grasso (born May 11, 1980) is an American college basketball coach, and head coach of the Bryant Bulldogs men's basketball team since 2018.

Playing career
Grasso played four years at Quinnipiac, where he ranks fifth all-time in assists, and fourth all-time in three-point field goals. He graduated in 2002 as Quinnipiac's second 1,000-point scorer in its Division I era and was inducted into the university's Athletics Hall of Fame in 2014.

Coaching career
After graduation, Grasso joined the coaching staff at Hofstra, where he was a graduate assistant for the 2002–03 season before moving on to Hartford for a two-year assistant coaching stint. He returned to his alma mater Quinnipiac for a season as an assistant coach before becoming an assistant coach under Dereck Whittenburg at Fordham.

When Whittenburg was fired on December 3, 2009, Grasso took over head coaching duties on an interim basis for the Rams for the remainder of the season. At 29 years old Grasso was then the youngest Division 1 coach in the country.

Grasso was not retained by Fordham on a full-time basis, and joined Tim Cluess's staff at Iona as an assistant coach. While with the Gaels, the team has appeared in five NCAA tournaments, and has won five MAAC conference tournament titles, along with three MAAC regular season titles.

On April 2, 2018, Grasso was named the 8th head coach in Bryant men's basketball history, and the second in the Division I era, replacing Tim O'Shea.

Grasso led the Bulldogs to one of the nation's biggest turnarounds. The Bulldogs were the only team in the nation to triple its win total. Grasso was recognized as a finalist for the Joe B. Hall Award as the nation's top first year head coach.

In the 2020–21 season Grasso was named the USBWA District 1 Coach of the Year, while leading Bryant to its best record in the program's D1 history.

In the 2021–2022 season Grasso was named NEC Coach of the Year, while leading Bryant to its best season in program history, winning 22 games and winning the regular season and conference tournament titles.

Head coaching record

References

Living people
1980 births
American men's basketball coaches
American men's basketball players
Basketball coaches from New York (state)
Basketball players from New York (state)
Bryant Bulldogs men's basketball coaches
College men's basketball head coaches in the United States
Fordham Rams men's basketball coaches
Hartford Hawks men's basketball coaches
Hofstra Pride men's basketball coaches
Iona Gaels men's basketball coaches
People from Syosset, New York
Quinnipiac Bobcats men's basketball coaches
Quinnipiac Bobcats men's basketball players
Sportspeople from Nassau County, New York